The women's team pursuit race of the 2013–14 ISU Speed Skating World Cup 1, arranged in the Olympic Oval, in Calgary, Alberta, Canada, was held on 10 November 2013.

The Dutch team won, while Japan came second, and Poland came third.

Results
The race took place on Sunday, 10 November, in the morning session, scheduled at 13:52.

References

Women team pursuit
1